CIX (pronounced as C-I-X) is a five-member South Korean boy band formed by C9 Entertainment in 2019, consisting of Jinyoung, BX, Seunghun, Hyunsuk and Yonghee. The group debuted on July 23, 2019, with their first EP titled Hello Chapter 1: Hello, Stranger.

Name
The group's name, CIX, the English acronym of "Complete in X", means that it is completed only when all 5 unknown members come together, and it implies the meaning of 'completion of unknown numbers'.

History

Pre-debut
Bae Jin-young is a former winning contestant of Mnet's Produce 101 Season 2. As a 10-month old trainee representing C9 Entertainment, he successfully finished at 10th place in the final rankings and earned his spot in the winning group Wanna One, notorious for being monster rookies in South Korea. Following the disbandment of Wanna One, Bae debuted as a soloist in 2019 with his self-composed album Hard to Say Goodbye, and held his first Asia fan-meeting tour "I'm Young" in connection with his debut, featuring eleven shows.

In October 2017, BX appeared as a contestant on JTBC's Mix Nine under his birth name Lee Byoung-gon, finishing in 9th place thus earning a spot in the winning group. However, YG later decided not to debut said group. As both Lee Byoung-gon and bandmate Kim Seung-hun were YGE trainees, in 2018 the two competed in the survival show YG Treasure Box for the label's next boy group, Treasure where both failed to debut in the finale. In November 2017, Seunghun also appeared on Mnet survival program Stray Kids while still a YGE trainee.

2019–2021: Debut, Hello tetralogy and begin of OK series
In February 2019, C9 starting revealed all five-members individual profile videos of upcoming boy group with tentative name C9Boyz.

In May 2019, the group's official name and logo were revealed. Ahead of debut, the group broadcast the reality show Hello CIX on June 4, 2019 through V Live. The show consisted of 10 episodes showcasing their various charms and road to debut.

On July 23, 2019, CIX released their debut EP Hello Chapter 1: Hello, Stranger and lead single "Movie Star". The album was a mild commercial success, selling 70,000 copies in two months. "Hello, Stranger", the debut showcase of CIX, was held on July 24, at SK Olympic Handball Gymnasium and the tickets reportedly sold out within 30 seconds, with over 16,000 fans trying to get on the server at once and with over 5,000 fans being put on standby for the tickets. On July 30, six days after their debut showcase, the group placed first on The Show, and earned the title of one of the fastest winning K-pop acts.

CIX signed with Warner Music Japan in August and made their Japanese debut on October 23, 2019 with a Japanese version of Hello Chapter 1: Hello, Stranger. The Japanese album features an additional Japanese track called "My New World".

On November 10, 2019, CIX held their Japanese debut showcase "Complete in X" at Line Cube Shibuya, and at Zepp Namba on November 17.

On November 19, 2019, CIX released their second EP Hello Chapter 2: Hello, Strange Place with the lead single "Numb", tackling social issues among youth in South Korea, such as poor mental health, bullying, and the obsession with test results among students.

On April 1, 2020, CIX released their first Japanese single Revival.

C9 announced that CIX would be hold their 1st fan-meeting tour, "Hello, FIX" starting from locations in North America, Taiwan, Thailand, and South Korea, but were cancelled due to the COVID-19 pandemic.

On April 30, 2020, CIX announced that their third EP Hello Chapter 3: Hello, Strange Time with the lead single "Jungle", which was originally set to be released on June 30, 2020.

On June 24, 2020, it was announced that a member of the group, Bae Jin-young, had injured himself during a practice session. C9 state that due to his injury they will have to postpone the release of the album and new plans will be released soon.

In September 2020, the fan-meeting were re-announced and would be hold online on October 11 in 40 regions.

On October 15, 2020, CIX announced that the new date for their third EP would released on October 27, 2020.

On January 14, 2021, CIX announced their fourth EP Hello Chapter Ø: Hello, Strange Dream and its lead single "Cinema" would be release on February 2.

On April 14, 2021, CIX released their second Japanese single All For You.

On July 1, 2021, CIX released the promotional single "Tesseract" through Universe Music for the mobile application Universe.

On August 17, 2021, their first studio album OK Prologue: Be OK and its lead single "Wave" was released.

2022–present: Pinky Swear, continue of OK series, concert tour
In March 2022, C9 announced that CIX would hold their first concert, Rebel, starting from April 15 to 17. C9 later announced new dates, with additional legs in the United States. On March 30, 2022, CIX released their first Japanese studio album Pinky Swear.

On August 22, 2022, CIX released their fifth EP OK Episode 1: OK Not.

On November 15, 2022, CIX announced that they would hold a world tour, "Save me, Kill me", starting from December 30 and 31 in Seoul and would continue in Europe and US. On February 20, 2023, it was announced the addition of four cities.

Members
Adapted from their Naver profile and website profile.

 BX (비엑스) – leader, rap
 Seunghun (승훈) – vocal
 Yonghee (용희) – vocal
 Jinyoung (배진영)  – vocal, dance
 Hyunsuk (현석) – vocal, rap, dance

Discography

Studio albums

Extended plays

Singles

Soundtrack appearances

Promotional singles

Other charted songs

Videography

Music videos

Filmography

Reality shows

Shows and concerts

Headlining
 CIX 1st Concert Rebel (2022)
 CIX 2nd World Tour "Save me, Kill me" (2022–2023)

Awards and nominations

Notes

References

External links
  

2019 establishments in South Korea
Musical groups from Seoul
K-pop music groups
Musical groups established in 2019
South Korean dance music groups
South Korean boy bands
Japanese-language singers of South Korea